The Eurovision Song Contest 1980 was the 25th edition of the annual Eurovision Song Contest. The contest was held at the Nederlands Congresgebouw on 19 April 1980 and was hosted by Dutch actress Marlous Fluitsma, although each song was introduced by a presenter from the participating nation (in some cases, this was the same person providing the commentary).

, notably, made its only appearance in the contest.

Location

, the winner of the 1979 contest, declined to host it for the second time in a row, as the Israel Broadcasting Authority (IBA) could not fund another international production without extra resources, and the Israeli government turned down a request to extend the IBA budget. The EBU also scheduled the broadcast for the same day as the Yom HaZikaron holiday, which meant that Israel could not even participate at all, marking the only time that the previous year's winning country did not compete the following year. After Spain – the second-placed country of 1979 – and (reportedly) the United Kingdom both declined to host, the Netherlands ultimately agreed to host the show in a small-scale production. According to the first minister Yair Lapid, son of Tommy Lapid who was then the IBA director general,his father called his then counterpart at NOS and convinced him to take the "undesired honour", when he realised that the extra cost could paralyse the regular work of the IBA.

The contest took place in The Hague at the Congresgebouw (presently known as the World Forum).

Format

Because of the limited budget and time available, NOS decided to recycle several elements of the 1976 production such as several opening video sequences, the soundtrack and many pieces and elements that were being used in other broadcaster shows since then.Again, Roland de Groot took charge of the design. As with the 1977 and 1978 contests, there were no pre-filmed postcards between the songs, with a guest presenter from each nation introducing the entries. Apart from this, the presenter, Marlous Fluitsma practically presented the contest almost entirely in Dutch, with exceptions in the protocol parts and in the voting where she used French and English according to tradition. Thus, the broadcaster host spent only US$725,000 on staging the show.

During the live interval act performance of San Fernando by The Dutch Rhythm Steel and Show Band with the Lee Jackson dancers, Hans van Willigenburg intercut brief interviews with some of the participants backstage in the green room, speaking to the singers from Germany, Luxembourg, the UK, Ireland, Norway and the Netherlands, each in their own language.

Australian-born Johnny Logan, representing his parents' country , was ultimately crowned the winner with the song "What's Another Year".

 were the runner-up for this year. After relatively poor placings in the two previous years, the  returned to form by coming third.

Song presenters 
Each of the 19 contestants was presented by a presenter from that country. Five countries took advantage and used their commentators from their respective broadcasters present in The Hague and they had the responsibility to also perform these function (Denmark, Sweden, Finland and Portugal used their television commentators, while Turkey chose their radio commentator). Each of the songs was introduced in one of the official languages ​​of the competing country.The UK presenter was incorrectly identified in the onscreen caption as 'Noel Edmunds' and the Finnish presenter as 'Heikki Haarma'.

 
 Şebnem Savaşçı
 Kelly Sakakou
 
 Mohammed Bouzidi
 Beatrice Cori
 Jørgen de Mylius
 Ulf Elfving
 Lyliam Stambac
 Heikki Harma
 Åse Kleveland (Norwegian representative in the 1966 contest, later host of the 1986 contest held in Bergen)
 Carolin Reiber
 Noel Edmonds
 Eládio Clímaco
 Marlous Fluitsma
 Évelyne Dhéliat
 Thelma Mansfield
 Mari Cruz Soriano
 Arlette Vincent

Participating countries 
After Israel announced its non-participation, Morocco entered into the contest instead. Monaco also withdrew from the contest, and would not return until 2004.

Conductors 
With the exception of Belgium, each performance had a conductor who directed the orchestra. This was the only contest to feature a Black conductor conducting an entry, that being Italy's conductor Del Newman.

 Richard Oesterreicher
 Attila Özdemiroğlu
 Jick Nacassian
 Norbert Daum
 
 Del Newman
 Allan Botschinsky
 Anders Berglund
 
 Ossi Runne
 Sigurd Jansen
 
 John Coleman
 
 Rogier van Otterloo
 Sylvano Santorio
 Noel Kelehan
  Javier Iturralde
 No conductor

Returning artists

Participants and results

Detailed voting results 

The scoring system implemented in 1975 remained the same; each country had a jury who awarded 12, 10, 8, 7, 6, 5, 4, 3, 2, 1 point(s) for their top ten songs. However this year for the first time, countries were required to declare their scores in ascending order, 1,2,3 etc. This change made for the added excitement of waiting for each country to award their highest 12 points at the end of each voting round.

For the voting sequence, Marlous Fluitsma used a unique telephone to speak to the nineteen jury spokespersons, although the phones were simply props and were not connected.

12 points 
Below is a summary of all 12 points in the final:

Spokespersons 

Listed below is the order in which votes were cast during the 1980 contest along with the spokesperson who was responsible for announcing the votes for their respective country.

 
 Başak Doğru
 Niki Venega
 Jacques Harvey
 Kamal Irassi
 
 Bent Evold
 Arne Weise
 Michel Stocker
 Kaarina Pönniö
 Roald Øyen
 TBC
 Ray Moore
 Teresa Cruz
 Flip van der Schalie
 Fabienne Égal
 David Heffernan
 Alfonso Lapeña
 Jacques Olivier

Broadcasts 

Each participating broadcaster was required to relay the contest via its networks. Non-participating EBU member broadcasters were also able to relay the contest as "passive participants". Broadcasters were able to send commentators to provide coverage of the contest in their own native language and to relay information about the artists and songs to their television viewers. Known details on the broadcasts in each country, including the specific broadcasting stations and commentators are shown in the tables below.

Notes

References

External links

 
1980
Music festivals in the Netherlands
1980 in music
1980 in the Netherlands
20th century in The Hague
April 1980 events in Europe
Events in The Hague
Music in The Hague